TOI-700 d is a near-Earth-sized exoplanet, likely rocky, orbiting within the habitable zone of the red dwarf TOI-700, the outermost planet within the system. The exoplanet is the first Earth-sized exoplanet in the habitable zone discovered by the Transiting Exoplanet Survey Satellite (TESS). 

It has been estimated that the planet receives about 86% the energy that the Earth receives from the Sun.

It was discovered in early January 2020 by the Transiting Exoplanet Survey Satellite (TESS).

Physical characteristics

Mass, radius and temperature
TOI-700 d is Earth-sized, an exoplanet that has a radius and mass similar to the Earth. A small chance of a runaway greenhouse effect exists.

Host star

TOI-700 is a red dwarf of spectral class M that is about 40% the mass and radius, and very roughly 50% of the temperature of the Sun. The star is bright with low levels of stellar activity. Over the 11 sectors observed with TESS, the star does not show a single white-light flare. The low rotation rate is also an indicator of low stellar activity.

Orbit
TOI-700 d orbits its host star every 37.4260 days.

Proposed habitability

TOI-700 d orbits in the habitable zone of its host star TOI-700. The solar wind ram pressure and intensity of the interplanetary magnetic field are expected to be similar to the Earth's, therefore retention of planetary atmosphere is likely.

History and discovery
TOI-700 d was discovered by the Transiting Exoplanet Survey Satellite (TESS) in early January 2020. This was the first Earth-sized exoplanet discovered by the TESS.

See also

 Kepler-62f
 Kepler-186f
 Kepler-442b
 LHS 1140 b
 List of potentially habitable exoplanets
 Proxima Centauri b
 TRAPPIST-1 e

References

External links
 TESS – Official WebSite
 ExoFOP TIC 150428135 TOI-700 in the Exoplanet Follow-up Observing Program website

 

Exoplanets discovered by TESS
Exoplanets discovered in 2020
Near-Earth-sized exoplanets in the habitable zone
Transiting exoplanets